The North Saskatchewan River valley parks system, also known as the Ribbon of Green or the River Valley Parks, is a continuous collection of urban parks around the North Saskatchewan River valley in the Edmonton Metropolitan Region of Alberta, Canada. The park system is made up of over 30 provincial and municipal parks situated around the river from Devon to Fort Saskatchewan, with trails connecting most of the parks together. 

Proposals to create a large park along Edmonton's riverfront were first proposed by landscape architect Frederick Todd in 1907, although the formation of a park system did not take shape until the late 20th century. In 1996, the River Valley Alliance (RVA) was formed to coordinate the development of the park system across the metropolitan region. Although large portions of the river valley are public parkland, some sections of the river valley are privately-owned. In addition to the park system, the river valley is also used by the metropolitan area for stormwater management. 

Most of the river valley is grasslands, although sections of it are forested. The river valley supports a high level of biodiversity and is used as a wildlife corridor by a variety of animals.

History 
The location of the present post-glacial river valley was created as a result of ice-marginal deposition. 

Archaeological sites from around the area suggest that the First Nations have used the resources found in the North Saskatchewan River valley for thousands of years, and may have even modified the river valley to a certain degree. The vegetation found in the river valley changed dramatically from the late 1700s to the 1900s, partly owing to climatic change during the Little Ice Age. The introduction of non-native vegetation may be attributed to the arrival of Métis and European farmers; who also harvested trees for lumber, and used the valley as a grazing area for their livestock.

Industrial developments in the river valley occurred during the late 19th and early 20th century, after the establishment of Fort Edmonton. During this period, resources from the river valley were extracted in order to build and maintain the city of Edmonton. The earliest brick-making and coal mining operations in the river valley occurred in the 1840s; with dump sites, gravel pits, and lumber yards built into the river valley during the late-19th and early 20th century. By the 1900s, most of the river valley was cleared of its trees for lumber. Developments and the extraction of resources in Edmonton shifted from the river valley to the tablelands in the 1920s as resources began to flow into the city from further distances; allowing for the river valley's ecosystem to reestablish itself. 

By the 1920s, the only developments in the river valley in Edmonton were dumps, golf courses, gravel pits, sewage plants, transportation corridors, and other low-intensity developments like parks. The last coal mine in the river valley was closed in 1970. During the mid-20th century, proposals to use the river valley for a highway network were submitted, with work on the freeway beginning at MacKinnon Ravine Park. However, the plan to build the highway was abandoned by 1974 due to public opposition.

Formation of a park system

In 1907, landscape architect Frederick Todd proposed that the city should take advantage of the natural space provided by the river valley. Acting upon Todd's advice, the City of Edmonton acquired over 100 properties in the river valley to be used as parklands between 1907 and 1931. In 1915, the provincial government adopted a report by Todd to protect the river valley and its associated ravines as a recreational area. In 1933, the City of Edmonton passed a local bylaw to regulate land use and to preserve the river valley as parkland. The city underwent another period where it acquiring private river valley properties from the 1950s to the 1970s. In 1970, the City of Edmonton passed a bylaw that defined the river valley and ravines and regulated developments close to the river valley, and created a long-term policy with the aim to purchase additional river valley lands. 

Shortly after the plans for the highway were abandoned in 1974, the provincial government created the Capital City Recreation Park, a park system that encompassed several river valley parks, including the Dawson, Gold Bar, Hermitage, and Rundle parks. During this period, small pieces of land were acquired to complete the trail system planned by the municipal and provincial government; connecting Hermitage Park and the High Level Bridge. The trail system was later extended to other parks in West Edmonton. In 1976, the provincial government also issued Orders-in-Council to restrict developments around the river valley from Devon to Fort Saskatchewan. 

In 1985, the city of Edmonton approved the North Saskatchewan River Valley Area Redevelopment Act, offering the river valley parks some form of legal protection; and designating the area an environmental protection area to be used for urban parks. 

A plan to unite the various parks that surrounded the North Saskatchewan River in the Edmonton Metropolitan Region was conceived during the early 1990s. In 1996, an ad hoc group of volunteers known as the River Valley Alliance (RVA) was formed from municipalities in the metropolitan area that the river passed through, including Devon, Edmonton, Fort Saskatchewan, Leduc County, Parkland County, Strathcona County, and Sturgeon County; with the aim to connect the riverside parks as a larger park system. The RVA itself was formally incorporated in 2003. 

Along with the provincial and federal governments, the RVA led the development of several plans for the park, including a concept plan in 1998, a trail plan in 2000, an updated concept plan in 2003, and a plan of action in 2007. The latter plan being a C$605-million plan to develop a metropolitan park system.

Parks
The North Saskatchewan River Valley park system, including its associated ravines, holds over 30 urban parks forming a part of the larger park system. Collectively, these parks form the largest municipally-operated urban park and the largest contiguous area of urban parkland in the country.

Several municipal parks and Strathcona Science Provincial Park form the North Saskatchewan River valley parks system. Municipal parks that form a part of the system include:  

 Allan Stein Park
 Argyll Park
 Buena Vista Park
 Capilano Park
 Dawson Park
 Diamond Park
 Emily Murphy Park
 Floden Park
 Forest Heights Park
 Gallagher Park
 Gold Bar Park
 Goldstick Park
 Government House Park
 Henrietta Muir Edwards/Rafters Landing
 Hermitage Park
 Irene Parlby Park
 Kinnaird Park
 Kinsmen Park
 Louise McKinney Riverfront Park
 MacKinnon Ravine Park
 Mill Creek Ravine
 Nellie McClung Park
 Queen Elizabeth Park
 Rio Park
 Riverdale Park
 Rundle Park
 Sir Wilfrid Laurier Park
 Terwillegar Park
 Victoria Park
 West River's Edge
 Whitemud Park
 William Hawrelak Park
Among the various municipally-maintained parks in Edmonton, the ones located in the river valley hold the highest availability of washrooms and picnic sites. The majority of the parks in the river valley have trails that connect to other areas of the park system. The river valley also holds a number of recreational facilities including baseball fields, dog parks, playgrounds, slipways, sports fields, and tennis courts. Although there exists a concentration of recreational facilities in the river system, service facilities including equipment rentals and food and beverage facilities remain scarce in the river valley.

As of 2007, it was estimated that 10 million guests visit the river valley annually, making it the second most visited site in Alberta after the West Edmonton Mall. However, concerns were raised that higher visitation rates to the river valley, along with the continued urban developments within it, may cause disruption of local wildlife, and threaten the long-term health of the river valley.

Trails

However, only  of the trails are paved. Portions of the network are disconnected, although the RVA plans to fully connect  of the trail system by 2024. An "overarching name" for the Regional Trail system was devised in 2020 between the RVA and the municipal governments. Several hectares of private land were also acquired by the municipal government in 2008 in order to "bridge the gaps" between the river valley's trail system.

The river itself is also viewed as a water trail for watercrafts and serves as the binding feature of the park system. The river's flow rate varies between 160-250 m3/s in May to its peak flow of 250-500 m3/s during the summer; making its conditions unsuitable for swimming, although optimal for canoeing, kayaking, and rafting. The river flows across Alberta and Saskatchewan towards Lake Winnipeg and the Nelson River, and eventually into Hudson's Bay.

Geography

Most of the park system surrounds the North Saskatchewan River, a river that cuts northeast through the Edmonton Metropolitan Region, and through the centre of Edmonton. The course of the river has been modified during the early 20th century as a result of damming, and for transportation purposes. Dams have also been built into the river, with its waters still used for agricultural purposes. 

The North Saskatchewan River valley is one of the few remaining natural areas in the region, with other portions of the metropolitan area having been industrialized or urbanized. The river valley has undergone changes due to past human developments; although the depth and slope of the river valley helped to limit the degree of developments within it. Most of the river valley is made up of grasslands although small sections of it are forested. There are 22 ravines associated with the river valley. Soil flows are not uncommon along the slopes of the unstable river valley. In years with low snow and rainfall, fires are more common.

Although sections of the river valley are made up of public parks, portions of it are also held under private ownership. As of 2020, the RVA continues to pursue the acquisition of private land around the river valley in order to fulfill the vision of an uninterrupted, connected trail system. Private facilities located in the river valley include EPCOR Utilities' Gold Bar Wastewater Treatment Plant. Additionally there exist several thousand properties and residential homes that are situated within  of the river valley. 

A number of public parks and golf courses are located in the river valley. In addition to its recreational uses, the river valley is also used to provide a number of ecological services, including carbon sequestration, erosion control, and stormwater management. Taken together, it is estimated the river valley provides approximately CA$350 million to $650 million in services to the region per year.

Fauna and flora
The North Saskatchewan River valley helps support a high level of biodiversity. A comprehensive survey of the river valley's fauna and flora does not exist, although it was estimated that there are at least 325 vascular plant species, 50 types of mosses, and 40 lichen species. It is estimated that there are 150 bird species, 50 mammal species, 27 fish species, and seven amphibian and reptile species in the river valley.

The river valley was historically dominated by alder, balsam poplars, and willow trees, although most of these trees were logged during the 19th century. As a result, the majority of the trees that stand in the river valley date after 1900. During this period a number of non-native fruit and vegetable species, shrubs, and trees were introduced into the river system. The river valley presently support a variety of flora such as aspen, balsam poplar, white birch, white spruce, and other types of grassland flora. Forests in the river valley contrast other forests in the region, which are more aspen and balsam poplar-heavy dominant; whereas forests in the river valley typically hold a larger amount of black and white spruces. Other types of plants found in the river valley include poison ivy, and Saskatoon serviceberries. The river valley's riparian zone is primarily made up of wetland habitats with grass, sedges, and willows; although in select areas, the forests will extend to the river's edge. 

The river valley serves as a wildlife corridor for animals to travel to other conservation areas. Because the river valley serves as a wildlife corridor, several wildlife crossings were built in locations where highways cross the river valley. Animals commonly found in the river valley includes coyotes, great horned owls, lake sturgeons, North American porcupines, pileated woodpeckers, plains garter snakes, walleye, and white-tailed deer. Cougars that have made their way into Edmonton usually arrive via the river valley system.

See also 
 Urban parks in Canada

References

Further reading

External links

 River Valley Alliance
 River Valley Parks - City of Edmonton
 River Valley - City of Fort Saskatchewan

 

Parks in Edmonton
Valleys of Alberta
Edmonton
North Saskatchewan River
Canyons and gorges of Canada
River valleys of Canada
Tourist attractions in Edmonton
Trans Canada Trail